"Forever" is a song by American rapper Lil Baby featuring fellow American rapper and singer Fridayy, from the former's third studio album It's Only Me (2022). It was written by the artists alongside Vory, Bizness Boi, and Fortune, the latter two producing it with Fridayy. The song peaked at number 8 on the Billboard Hot 100.

Composition
"Forever" contains an R&B-style crooned hook from Fridayy, and has been described as a love song.

Critical reception
Shanté Collier-McDermott of Clash praised Fridayy's guest appearance, writing, "his uniquely toned vocals framing a deep love song." Likewise, Carl Lamarre of Billboard said, "I also am a fan of Fridayy's hook capabilities, as the pairing of him and Baby on 'Forever' is a winner for me."

Charts

References

2022 songs
Lil Baby songs
Songs written by Lil Baby
Songs written by Vory
Emo rap songs